Nice Guys Finish First (BBC Horizon television series) is a 1986 documentary by Richard Dawkins which discusses selfishness and cooperation, arguing that evolution often favors co-operative behaviour, and focusing especially on the tit for tat strategy of the prisoner's dilemma game. The film is approximately 45 minutes long and was produced by Jeremy Taylor.

The twelfth chapter in Dawkins' book The Selfish Gene (added in the second edition, 1989) is also named Nice Guys Finish First and explores similar material.

Overview 

In the opening scene, Richard Dawkins responds very precisely to what he views as a misrepresentation of his first book, The Selfish Gene. In particular, the response of the right wing for using it as justification for social Darwinism and laissez-faire economics (free-market capitalism). Dawkins has examined this issue throughout his career and focused much of his documentary The Genius of Charles Darwin on this very issue.

The concept of reciprocal altruism is a central theme of this documentary. Additionally, Dawkins examines the tragedy of the commons, and the dilemma that it presents. He uses the large area of common land Port Meadow in Oxford, England, which has been battered by overgrazing. This provides an example of the infamous tragedy of the commons. Fourteen academics as well as experts in game theory submitted their own computer programs to compete in a tournament to see who would win in the prisoner's dilemma. The winner was tit for tat, a program based on "equal retaliation", and Dawkins illustrates the four conditions of tit for tat.

 Unless provoked, the agent will always cooperate.
 If provoked, the agent will retaliate.
 The agent is quick to forgive.
 The agent must have a good chance of competing against the opponent more than once.

In a second trial, this time of over sixty applicants, tit for tat won again.

See also
 Altruism in animals
 Ethology
 Evolutionarily stable strategy
 Evolutionary game theory
 Natural selection
 Prisoner's Dilemma
 Sociobiology
 The Selfish Gene
 Tit for tat
 Tragedy of the commons
 Mutual Aid: A Factor of Evolution

External links 
 

1986 films
BBC television documentaries
Documentary films about science
Horizon (British TV series)
Works by Richard Dawkins
Documentary television shows about evolution
1980s British films